Kringler is a village in Akershus, Norway.

Villages in Akershus